The 1983–84 Rugby Football League season was the 89th ever season of professional rugby league football in Britain. Sixteen teams competed from August, 1983 until May, 1984 for the Slalom Lager Championship.

The Second Division was increased to 18 clubs with the introduction of Kent Invicta, who played their home fixtures at Maidstone, this season.

Rule changes
End of possession:
 A "handover" was introduced after the sixth tackle, replacing the scrum that had previously been formed at that point. The team receiving possession would now play-the-ball to carry on play.
 Scrum rules were changed which meant the non offending side had head and ball advantage, effectively making the scrum a non contest.
Value of a try:
 The number of points a team scored from a try increased from three to four. The aim of this change was to "incentivise scoring tries" over kicking penalty goals, which were worth two points, because the tries were more entertaining.
Temporary suspension:
 The 10-minute "sin bin" was introduced.

Season summary

Slalom Lager League Champions: Hull Kingston Rovers

Hull Kingston Rovers finished on top of the First Division table to claim their fifth championship, and also the Rugby League Premiership competition, this was the first occasion the 'Championship / Premiership Double' had been achieved.

State Express Challenge Cup Winners: Widnes (19-6 v Wigan)

John Player Special Trophy Winners: Leeds (18-10 v Widnes). During the competition, Danny Wilson of Swinton scored a record 5 drop goals in the tie against Hunslet on 6 Nov 1983.

Slalom Lager Premiership Trophy Winners: Hull Kingston Rovers (18-10 v Castleford)

Barrow (from Cumbria) beat Widnes 12–8 to win the Lancashire County Cup, and Hull F.C. beat Castleford 13–2 to win the Yorkshire County Cup

1983/84 Queensland Tour

At the end of the 1983 seasons in Qld and NSW, the Queensland team also toured Papua New Guinea and England. Their tour of Great Britain saw them play three matches. The first against Hull Kingston Rovers resulted in an 8–6 loss, though the Wally Lewis led Maroons then easily won their remaining matches against Wigan (40–2) and Leeds (58–2)

League Tables

Championship
Final Standings

Second Division

Challenge Cup

The 1983-84 State Express Challenge Cup was won by Widnes after defeating Wigan 19-6 in the final.

The Final was played at Wembley before a crowd of 80,116.

League Cup

Premiership

References

Sources
1983-84 Rugby Football League season at wigan.rlfans.com

1983 in English rugby league
1984 in English rugby league
Rugby Football League seasons
1983 in Welsh rugby league
1984 in Welsh rugby league